C1q and tumor necrosis factor related protein 4 is a protein that in humans is encoded by the C1QTNF4 gene.

References

Further reading